The 86 Years of Eubie Blake is a 1969 studio album by ragtime pianist Eubie Blake and marks a reunion for Blake with his longtime collaborator, Noble Sissle. 

The album was recorded in three sessions, the first on December 26, 1968, followed by two more on February 6, and March 12, 1969.

In 2006 the Library of Congress selected The Eighty-Six Years of Eubie Blake for inclusion in the National Recording Registry based on its cultural, artistic or historical significance.

Track listing

Personnel
 Eubie Blake, piano
 Noble Sissle, vocals

References

1969 albums
United States National Recording Registry recordings
Eubie Blake albums
United States National Recording Registry albums